"Gunman" is the debut single by English speed garage duo 187 Lockdown. The song was released twice, first in November 1997 where it reached No. 16 on the UK Singles Chart and No. 1 on the UK Dance Chart, then again the following year, peaking one place lower at No. 17.

The song contains samples of Ennio Morricone's "Carillon (Watch chimes)" (from the film For a Few Dollars More), and a vocal sample from Dr Alimantado's "Gimmie Mi Gun".

Impact and legacy
In 1999, Tom Ewing of Freaky Trigger ranked the song at number 84 in his list of the "Top 100 Singles of the 90s", saying "'Gunman' is crude, undeniable stuff, formulaic as hell but a formula that felt – feels – fresh, exciting and accessible."

The Guardian listed "Gunman" at number 8 in their list of "The best UK garage tracks - ranked!" in 2019.

Mixmag included the song in their list of "The 15 Best Speed Garage Records Released in '97 and '98".

Redbull.com included the song in their list of "10 underground UK garage classics that still sound fresh today".

Track listing
UK CD single
 "Gunman" (Pointed Radio Edit) (3:07)
 "Gunman" (Nu-Birth's Gun Groove Dub) (6:30)
 "Gunman" (Original Mix) (6:19)
 "Gunman" (Natural Born Chillers Remix) (7:12)
 "Gunman" (Blunt Edit) (3:31)

Charts

References

1997 songs
1997 debut singles
1998 singles
187 Lockdown songs
East West Records singles